Citizen Band were a New Zealand band formed by the brothers Geoff and Mike Chunn, both of whom had previously been members of Split Enz.

Band members 

Geoff Chunn played guitar, sang, and wrote most of the songs. Mike Chunn played bass guitar. Other members were guitarist Greg Clark and drummer Brent Eccles, both previously in New Zealand glam rock band Space Waltz. Formed in 1977 after Mike Chunn left Split Enz due to his struggles with agoraphobia, the band played concerts around Auckland including a free concert in Albert Park and a one-day rock festival. The band recorded their first album Citizen Band at Mandrill studios, produced by the band and Glyn Tucker.

Their second album Just Drove Thru Town was recorded at Mandrill Studios on 18–30 June 1979. It was produced by Jay Lewis and engineered by Glyn Tucker. Two singles were released from the album, "Rust in My Car"/"Dig That Tex" and "No Stereo"/"SOS".

After the band moved to Australia, Mike Chunn left the band, and was replaced by Roland Killeen. The band broke up in 1982.

Citizen Band's original lineup could be regarded as a New Zealand supergroup, as both Chunn brothers were previously in Split Enz, and Clark and Eccles were in glam rock band Space Waltz.

Discography

Concerts 
In 2012, Citizen Band, along with other NZ bands who played at The Gluepot in the 1970s: Dragon, Hello Sailor, and Street Talk, reunited for a 'Gluepot Reunion' concert.

On 27 May 2016, Citizen Band reformed for a one-off concert at the inaugural Sounds Session organised by The Sound radio station at the Tuning Fork in Auckland.  Tickets could only be obtained by winning them from the radio station via a TXT message sent when an earlier named New Zealand song was played (May is New Zealand Music Month).

The play list was:
 Good Morning Citizen
 The Man's A Wonder
 Dig That Tex
 Julia
 Rust in My Car
 I Feel Good
and then an encore of "Hold Tight" a cover of a Dave Dee, Dozy, Beaky, Mick & Tich song.

References

External links
Citizen Band at Australian Rock Database by Magnus Holmgren
Play It Strange

APRA Award winners
New Zealand rock music groups
Sibling musical groups